The Singles is a compilation album by English drummer Phil Collins. It was released on 14 October 2016 through Atlantic Records and Warner Music. The album is Collins' fourth compilation album—after ...Hits (1998), The Platinum Collection (2004) and Love Songs: A Compilation... Old and New (2004)—and came at the end of his Take a Look at Me Now series, which saw him remaster and reissue his entire back catalogue dating back to 1981's Face Value. The compilation is made up of most of the hit singles from Collins' solo career, as well as lesser known singles. The album was released in two versions, a standard 2-CD edition and a deluxe 3-CD edition. A vinyl edition was also released, first available as a 4-LP set with the same track list as in standard 2-CD edition, but it was, in 2018, replaced with a 2-LP set, which have only 19 selected tracks from previous version.

Track listing
All tracks written by Phil Collins, except where noted.

Standard 2-CD edition

Deluxe 3-CD edition

For the 3-CD edition of the album, the songs are arranged in chronological order with the exception of "Who Said I Would" (originally from No Jacket Required) which was released as a live single from the album Serious Hits... Live! (1990), released between the studio album releases of ...But Seriously and Both Sides.

Charts

Weekly charts

Year-end charts

Certifications

References

2016 compilation albums
Phil Collins compilation albums
Albums produced by Arif Mardin
Albums produced by Babyface (musician)
Albums produced by Hugh Padgham
Albums produced by Mark Mancina
Albums produced by Phil Collins
Albums produced by Rob Cavallo
Atlantic Records compilation albums